Rune Fredh (12 July 1945 – 23 August 2006) was a Norwegian politician who was Party Secretary of the Socialist Electoral League and later the Socialist Left Party from 1973–1977.

Early life and career 
Fredh was born on 23 September 1945 in Borge, Østfold. He started his political career as a member of the communist party youth wing. He later became chairman of the Labour Party of the Communist Party and became a member of the Bergen City Council.

He later became a member of the Communist Party and when the party participated in the Socialist Electoral League, he was elected Organizational Secretary of the coalition in the national convention of 1973. He was a notable figure during the unification process, and sided with the coalition "supporters" led by Reidar T. Larsen in the Communist Party. When the party broke off its ties to the Socialist Left Party Fredh left the Communist Party to become a member of the Socialist Left. In the new party's first national convention he was elected party secretary. In 1977 he was replaced by Lasse Jahnsen in the role of secretary.

In 1989 he became Secretary of the People's Alliance for Environment, Labor and Welfare, a small county list in Østfold which sought to support the candidacy of Larsen; he'd lost his seat in the 1977 election. The coalition was made up of local Labour, Socialist Left and Communist Party members.

References 

1945 births
2006 deaths
Socialist Left Party (Norway) politicians
People from Fredrikstad